Catalina is a feminine given name. It is a Spanish form of a variation of the name Katherine. Catalina is an equivalent to Katherine or Catherine in English, Αικατερίνη (Ekaterini) and Κατερίνα (Katerina) in Greek, Cătălina or Caterina in Romanian, Екатерина (Yekaterina) in Russian, Caterina in Italian, Catalan and Ukrainian, Catherine in French, Katarzyna in Polish, and Catarina in Portuguese and Galician. 

Notable people with the name include:

 Catalina, Duchess of Villena (1403–1439), Infanta of Aragon
 Catalina Artusi (born 1990), Argentine actress
 Catalina Berroa (1849–1911), Cuban musician
 Catalina Botero Marino (born 1965), Colombian attorney
 Catalina Castaño (born 1979), Colombian tennis player
 Cătălina Cristea (born 1975), Romanian tennis player
 Catalina Denis, Colombian actress
 Catalina de Erauso (1592–1650), Spanish explorer
 Cătălina Gheorghițoaia (born 1975), Romanian fencer
 Catalina Guirado (born 1974), British-New Zealander model and TV star
 Catalina Larranaga (born 1969), American actress
 Catalina Parot (born 1956), Chilean politician
 Catalina Pelaez (born 1991), Colombian squash player
 Cătălina Ponor (born 1987), Romanian artistic gymnast
 Catalina de los Ríos y Lisperguer (1604–1665), Chilean murderer
 Catalina Robayo (born 1989), Colombian beauty queen
 Catalina Rosales, Mexican paralympic athlete
 Catalina Saavedra (born 1968), Chilean actress
 Catalina Sandino Moreno (born 1981), Colombian actress
 Catalina Sarsfield, French-born Irish Jacobite of the 18th century
 Catalina Speroni (1938–2010), Argentine actress
Catalina Thomás (1533–1574), Spanish saint
 Catalina Trail (born 1949), Mexican naturalist
 Catalina Usme (born 1989), Colombian football player
 Catalina Vallejos (born 1989), Chilean model
 Catalina Vasquez Villalpando (born 1940), American politician
 Catalina Yue, Canadian musician

References

Spanish feminine given names